Sóc Trăng is a province in the Mekong Delta of southern Vietnam, with its capital in Sóc Trăng. The province occupies an area of 3,223 km², and has a population of approximately 1,213,400.

Geography
Sóc Trăng province lies roughly between 9°14'N and 9°56'N latitude and between 105°34'E and 106°18'E longitude. It is bordered by Trà Vinh to the northeast, Vĩnh Long to the north, Hậu Giang to the northwest and Bạc Liêu to the south. The province has two large rivers: the Hậu River and the Mỹ Thanh River. The capital of Sóc Trăng province is Sóc Trăng city.

Administrative divisions
Sóc Trăng is subdivided into 11 district-level sub-divisions:

 9 districts:

 Châu Thành
 Cù Lao Dung
 Kế Sách
 Long Phú
 Mỹ Tú
 Mỹ Xuyên
 Thạnh Trị
 Trần Đề

 2 district-level town:
 Vĩnh Châu
 Ngã Năm
 1 provincial city:
 Sóc Trăng (capital)

They are further subdivided into 12 commune-level towns (or townlets), 80 communes, and 17 wards.

References

External links

 
Provinces of Vietnam